Glyn Curt Milburn (born February 19, 1971) is a former American football running back and return specialist who played for nine seasons in the National Football League (NFL). After playing college football for Stanford, he was drafted by the Denver Broncos in the second round of the 1993 NFL Draft. He also played for the Detroit Lions, Chicago Bears, and San Diego Chargers. He holds the NFL record for most all-purpose yards gained in a single game with 404 on December 10, 1995. He was also the Chicago Bears all-time leading kick returner with 4,596 yards. He was selection to the Pro Bowl twice in 1995 and 1999, and was named first-team All-Pro in 1999. After his playing career ended, he was the General Manager and the Director of Player Personnel for the Austin Wranglers in the Arena Football League from 2004 to 2008.

College career
Milburn attended the University of Oklahoma in 1988 and Stanford University from 1990-1992.

Professional career

Denver Broncos
Milburn was selected by the Denver Broncos in the second round (43rd overall) of the 1993 NFL Draft. He tied the Broncos' franchise record for kick returns in a playoff game with 6 against the Los Angeles Raiders on January 9, 1994. In 1995, he set the Broncos' franchise records for kick return yards in a season with 1,269, and total return yards in a season with 1,623. On December 10, 1995, he set an NFL record for all-purpose yards in a game with 404 total yards.

Detroit Lions
By the end of the 1995 season, Terrell Davis had established himself as the Broncos starting running back, and Milburn was traded to the Detroit Lions for second- (58th overall) and seventh-round picks in the 1996 NFL Draft. Milburn played in 32 regular season games for the Lions.

Green Bay Packers 
The Green Bay Packers acquired Milburn in a trade with the Lions in April 1998.  He participated in the Packers preseason activities, but on August 29, 1998, he was traded to the Chicago Bears in exchange for a seventh round draft pick (later used to select wide receiver Donald Driver).

Chicago Bears
Playing for the Bears from 1998 to 2001, Milburn set the franchise record for kickoff return yards with 4,596, though he was eventually passed by Devin Hester.

San Diego Chargers
On November 9, 2001, the San Diego Chargers signed Milburn. He played in six games and was used primarily as a punt returner.

NFL career statistics
Receiving Stats

Returning Stats

Rushing Stats

References

1971 births
Living people
Players of American football from Los Angeles
American football running backs
American football return specialists
Oklahoma Sooners football players
Stanford Cardinal football players
Denver Broncos players
Detroit Lions players
Chicago Bears players
San Diego Chargers players
American Conference Pro Bowl players
National Conference Pro Bowl players
Austin Wranglers
Arena Football League executives